David Mason  is a teacher and former Regimental Sergeant Major in the Royal Marines.

Biography
Mason attended Baysgarth School in Barton-upon-Humber from 1986 to 1991 before joining the Royal Marines.

After joining the marines he was posted to 3 Commando Brigade and served in Northern Ireland, Yugoslavia, Iraq, and Afghanistan. He was promoted to the rank of Regimental sergeant major. Whilst serving with the marines, Mason studied for an undergraduate degree in history with the Open University and a master's degree in military history from the University of Birmingham.

Mason studied for a PGCE at the University of Exeter. He undertook his training at Haygrove School in Somerset.

He was awarded an MBE in the 2021 New Year Honours.

References

Living people
People from Barton-upon-Humber
Members of the Order of the British Empire
Alumni of the Open University
Alumni of the University of Birmingham
Royal Navy personnel of the War in Afghanistan (2001–2021)
Warrant Officers to the Royal Navy
British military personnel of The Troubles (Northern Ireland)
British schoolteachers
Year of birth missing (living people)